This article describes some of the 2018 seasons of TCR Series across the world.

VLN TCR Class

The 2018 Veranstaltergemeinschaft Langstreckenpokal Nürburgring TCR Class was the second season for the TCR Class in the championship.

Teams and drivers

Calendar and results

TCR Baltic Trophy

The 2018 TCR Baltic Trophy Ws the second season of the TCR Baltic Trophy. TCR Baltic Trophy was contested within the Baltic Touring Car Championship events.

Teams and drivers

Calendar and results
The 2018 schedule was announced on 15 March 2018. The calendar includes three rounds in Latvia and two in Estonia all supporting the Baltic Touring Car Championship.

Championship standings

TCR Swiss Trophy 
TCR Swiss Trophy was an event, organized by Auto Sport Switzerland and was the inaugural season. The calendar consisted of 5 events from TCR Europe, TCR BeNeLux, ADAC TCR Germany and TCR Italy.

Calendar and results

Championship standings 

† – Drivers did not finish the race, but were classified as they completed over 75% of the race distance.

TCR Ibérico Touring Car Series 
The 2018 TCR Ibérico Touring Car Series season was the second season of the TCR Ibérico Touring Car Series. The championship started at Circuito Internacional de Vila Real in Portugal on 23 June and ended at Circuit de Barcelona-Catalunya in Spain on 21 October.

Calendar and results

Championship standings 

† – Drivers did not finish the race, but were classified as they completed over 75% of the race distance.

References

External links
 

2018 in motorsport
2018 in European sport
2018